Zaranjan (also Romanized as Zaranjān and Zarenjān; also known as Aranjān, Zarengān, Zarinjān, and Zenjān) is a village in Nivan Rural District, in the Central District of Golpayegan County, Isfahan Province, Iran. At the 2006 census, its population was 914, in 249 families.

References 

Populated places in Golpayegan County